Benjamin Richard Maher MBE (born 30 January 1983, in Enfield) is a British show jumper. He represented Britain at the 2008 Beijing Olympics, 2009 European Championships in Windsor, 2012 London Olympics, 2016 Rio Olympics and the 2020 Tokyo Olympics. He won the team jumping gold at the London Olympics with Team GB, their first team jumping gold medal for 60 years, and an individual gold for Great Britain at the 2020 Tokyo Olympics. He also won bronze at the 2011 Europeans Championships in Madrid, Spain.
He has won many international Grand Prix, including the Olympia Grand Prix, the King George V Gold Cup at Hickstead and an FEI World Cup Qualifier Grand Prix at Wellington with various rides.

Maher was selected as part of the 2016 British Olympic Show Jumping Team with Tic Tac

Maher began riding at the age of eight. He was educated at Saffron Walden County High School, and after finishing school, he trained with Liz Edgar before travelling to Switzerland to further his education with Beat Mandli.

He had success as a young rider, winning Team Gold with the British Young Riders Team at the European Championships in 2004. He is now a regular member for the British team, and has been ranked as high as 5th on the Longines World Rankings.

International Championship results

Career

In 2005, CSIO5* Hickstead, Great Britain: Maher won the Hickstead Derby

In 2008, Ben competed at the Olympic Games with Rolette.

In 2010, CSI5*-W s'-Hertogenbosch, The Netherlands: On 26 March, Maher and Wonderboy III took the top spot in the feature class of the opening day. This was the 1.50m Rabobank Prijs.

CSI5*-W London Olympia, Great Britain: Ben and Noctambule Courcelle won the Puissance.

In 2011, CSI5*-W Basel, Switzerland: Oscar took 4th prize in a speed-class.

CSI5*-W Zurich, Switzerland: Maher and Robin Hood W came 2nd in the Rolex FEI World Cup Qualifier.

CSI3* Lummen, Belgium: Tripple X III came 2nd.

CES5* European Championships, Madrid, Spain: The British team of Nick Skelton (Carlo) (1.04/0/0); Guy Williams (Titus) (7.01)/(12)/0; Ben Maher (Tripple X III) (2.76/4/4); and John Whitaker (Peppermill) (5.66/4/8) took Team Bronze. Ben and Tripple X III also took 12th position individually.

CSI5*-W Olympia Horse Show, London, UK: Ben and his home-bred Tripple X III came 1st in the Rolex FEI World Cup.

In 2012, CSI5*-W Basel, Switzerland: Tripple X III won the feature 1m55 class on Friday night.

Won gold medal at the 2012 London Olympics for Great Britain in the Team showjumping.

Maher was appointed Member of the Order of the British Empire (MBE) in the 2013 New Year Honours for services to equestrianism.

In 2013, won team gold and individual silver medals at the European Championships, riding Cella.

Won Olympia London International Horse Show Grand Prix riding Tripple X.

Won the Longines Global Champions Tour Grand Prix of London at Olympic Park with his grey mare Cella.

In 2014, won the $125,000 Grand Prix CSI3* at WEF with Cella.

Won WEF World Cup Qualifier on Cella

Won the €130,000 Grand Prix in Guangzhou, China with Vainquer

Won the Olympia London International Horse Show Grand Prix on Diva II.

In 2015, won World Cup CSI5* at WEF on Diva II

Won Rotterdam Nations Cup on Diva II, with team members Joe Clee/Utamaro D'Ecaussines, Jessica Mendoza/Spirit T, Michael Whitaker/Cassionato

Tied for first with Karim Elzoghby/Amelia at Global Champions Tour Paris Grand Prix

In 2016, won the $500,000 Rolex CSI5* at WEF with Sarena

Won the Beijing World Cup Qualifier on Wavanta

Won the Rome Nations Cup with Tic Tac and teammates Jessica Mendoza/Spirit T, Michael Whitaker/Cassionato, and John Whitaker/Ornellaia

He won two consecutive  Longines Global Champions wins in 2018 and 2019.

Won the Individual Showjumping Gold Medal at Tokyo 2020 Olympics, riding Explosion W.

Owners 
Ben Maher currently has horses under several owners, most notably being Jane Clark, a longtime owner and supporter of international show jumping. Clark owns Sarena, Tic Tac, Aristo Z, and Cella. He also rides Tatiana Korsakova's Diva II, EM Horses' Boomerang, Amy Carr's Sentimiento LS La Silla, Vivien Thompson's Diablo, and Poden Farm's Cliff 67, F One USA, and Untouched.

See also
 2012 Summer Olympics and Paralympics gold post boxes

References

External links 
 
 

1983 births
British male equestrians
British show jumping riders
Elsenham
English male equestrians
English Olympic medallists
Equestrians at the 2008 Summer Olympics
Equestrians at the 2012 Summer Olympics
Equestrians at the 2016 Summer Olympics
Equestrians at the 2020 Summer Olympics
Living people
Medalists at the 2012 Summer Olympics
Medalists at the 2020 Summer Olympics
Members of the Order of the British Empire
Olympic equestrians of Great Britain
Olympic gold medallists for Great Britain
Olympic medalists in equestrian
People from Enfield, London
People from Uttlesford (district)